Brighton & Hove Greyhound Stadium is a greyhound racing track located in the Hove Park area of the city of Brighton and Hove, East Sussex. The stadium also has a restaurant and a number of bars and is owned by the Gala Coral Group and race meetings are held every Thursday and Saturday evening, in addition to three afternoon meetings.

Competitions 
 Regency
 Olympic
 Brighton Belle
 Sussex Cup

Origins 
The plans for the site on Nevill Road and adjoining Hove Park were unanimously passed by the Brighton Corporation in January 1928. Charles Wakeling, Freddie Arnold and Major Carlos Campbell instigated the construction and the Greyhound Racing Association (GRA) had shares in the company called the Greyhound Racing Association (Brighton) Ltd.

Opening 
The first race to be held at the track known as the Hove Sports Stadium was the Hove Stakes and took place on 2 June 1928. 'Costs' the 7-4f won the 525 yards race for trainer Toone and won £16 for his owner W. G. Hooper, who was a solicitor by trade.

Pre-war history 
Originally the track was primitive with the hare being wound around the course by hand and it took ten years of racing before electric lighting was installed. A hand-operated tote was installed in 1932 but suffered from the government ban on tote betting the same year until the 1934 Betting and Lotteries Act reversed the ban. In 1940 the resident kennels moved to Morley Lodge, Albourne, Henfield, West Sussex. This purpose built kennel facility for over 200 hounds offered a modern brick facility and each range had its own grass paddock. Breeding kennels were set up on a farm in Sussex and rearing kennels were built in nearby Cumberland. The circuit was described as easy swinging turns of 160 yards and short straights of 85 yards and distances were 310, 525, 565 and 800 yards with an 'Inside MacWhirter Trackless' hare. Amenities included a club in both enclosures (the Nevill Road Club and the Orchard Road Club) and there were dining facilities in the Grand enclosure.

1945–1980 

After the war the company was called the Brighton & Hove Stadium Ltd and in 1948 the stadium introduced a new event called the Regency. The Managing Director Charles Wakeling who was also the chairman of Brighton & Hove Albion F.C. died leaving the stadium in the hands of Major Carlos Campbell. Campbell died in 1958 leaving the controlling interest of the shares in the hands of the GRA. They brought in Gerard Kealey as General Manager and Peter Shotton as Racing Manager (the latter replacing Tom King in 1964) and the pair went about building up the reputation of the seaside track. During the sixties racing was held on Wednesday and Saturday evenings, in addition to the restaurant there was three buffet bars and seven licensed bars. The circumference had changed to 491 yards with distances of 550, 725 and 880 yards with an 'Inside Sumner' hare. The track trainers consisted of Fred Lugg, Arthur Hancock, Birch & Gunner (Charles George) Smith. Gunner Smith steered Luxury Liner through to 1961 English Greyhound Derby Derby final.

George Curtis represented Brighton in two consecutive Greyhound Derby finals with Hard Held in 1969 and Sirius in 1970.

Brighton introduced travelling payments for open race trainers to encourage entries to travel south, and the Sussex Cup was inaugurated in 1972, followed by the Brighton Belle for bitches in 1975. In 1976 a significant deal was struck in when Coral Leisure purchasing Brighton and Romford. Des Nichols was brought in as Racing Manager from sister track Romford when Shotton moved to Wembley in 1978. Jim Layton succeeded him a few years later. A fourth major race called the Olympic was introduced in 1979

1981–1999 
George Curtis became a three times Greyhound Trainer of the Year winning the title in 1983, 1984 and 1986. Brighton greyhound Ballyregan Bob trained by Curtis became a household name after breaking the world record in 1986 by winning 32 consecutive races. One year later the stadium became the last course in Britain to remove their turf surface changing to all-sand. Gerard Kealey died in 1989 and Peter Shotton became general manager (he had returned to Brighton from Wembley).

In 1991 Coral announced that their greyhound tracks would be sold to fund the purchase of 73 bingo halls from Granada Theatre Ltd, but, despite the deal being struck and subsequent birth of Gala Bingo, the tracks remained under the ownership of Coral. However, Coral did lose a court case around the same time to the Alliance & Leicester, forcing them to relinquish land where the Orchard Road enclosure stood. A new generation of trainers arrived at Hove in the 1990s. Brian Clemenson was three times champion trainer, and his assistant Alan (Claude) Gardiner replaced Bill Masters when he retired. Peter Miller replaced Jim Layton as racing manager in 1994.

2000–present
Brian Clemenson was three times champion trainer in 2003, 2004 and 2005. The track remains one of the premier venues in the country and attracts some of the best trainers in the country including recent acquisitions Seamus Cahill and Norah McEllistrim. In 2018 the stadium signed a deal with SIS to race every Tuesday, Wednesday and Friday afternoon, and every Thursday and Saturday evening.

In 2019 the track created new race distance of 500 metres; the track had previously raced over that distance in the 1970s. The 515 distance was retained for open races.

Track records

Current records

Former records

+ Record holder during year

Pre Metric

References

External links
 Official site

Sports venues in Brighton and Hove
Greyhound racing venues in the United Kingdom
Sport in Brighton and Hove